Discovery: In the Steps of Columbus is a video game developed by Impressions Games and published in 1992 for MS-DOS compatible operating systems.

Plot
Discovery: In the Steps of Columbus is a historical simulation involving discovery and conquest with ships exploring the world. The player settles in and builds ports in new lands, and if the settlers survive natural disasters and attacks by natives, they clear the land and explore as they build permanent settlements.  The player competes against computer-controlled opponents from other countries, which results in confrontations as they build their empires.

Reception
The game was reviewed in 1993 in Dragon #191 by Hartley, Patricia, and Kirk Lesser in "The Role of Computers" column. The reviewers gave the game 3 out of 5 stars. In a 1993 survey of pre-20th century wargames, Computer Gaming World <gave Discovery two stars out of five, calling it "Slow, dull, user-unfriendly".

References

External links
Discovery: In the Steps of Columbus at MobyGames

1992 video games
Amiga games
DOS games
Impressions Games games
Video games developed in the United Kingdom